Eséka Airport  is a public use airport located near Eséka, Centre, Cameroon.

See also
List of airports in Cameroon

References

External links 
 Airport record for Eséka Airport at Landings.com

Airports in Cameroon
Centre Region (Cameroon)